Joyce Gwendolen Quin, Baroness Quin,  (born 26 November 1944) is a British Labour Party politician. She served as Member of Parliament (MP) for Gateshead East and Washington West and for its predecessor Gateshead East from 1987 to 2005.

Early life and career 
Quin was educated at Whitley Bay Grammar School, and Newcastle University where she gained first class honours in French and was  first in her year.   She subsequently gained an M.Sc. in International Relations at the London School of Economics. She worked as a French language lecturer and tutor at the University of Bath and Durham University. Quin is the grand-niece of Labour Party politician Joshua Ritson (1874–1955).

She served as Member of the European Parliament for Tyne South and Wear and Tyne and Wear successively from 1979 to 1989. During her time as an MEP she served as Labour spokesperson on Fisheries from 1979 to 1984. She was a member of the Agriculture, Women's Rights, Regional and Economic Affairs Committee. In 1979, she tabled the resolution to set up a Register of Members' Interests which was eventually accepted by the European Parliament.

Member of Parliament 
Quin entered the House of Commons in the 1987 election as Member of Parliament for Gateshead East. In Opposition (1987-1997) she served on the Labour front bench as a Shadow Minister for Consumer Affairs, Trade Policy, Regional Policy and Employment (dealing with the EU Social Chapter). From 1994 to 1997 she served as Shadow Europe Minister and was Deputy to Shadow Foreign Secretary Robin Cook.

After boundary changes for the 1997 general election, she represented the new Gateshead East and Washington West constituency from 1997 until she stepped down at the 2005 general election and was replaced by Sharon Hodgson. Quin served as prisons minister, Minister for Europe, and as Minister of State for Agriculture (and deputy to Cabinet Minister, Nick Brown). She asked to retire as a minister in 2001 to concentrate on her constituency interests. She had intended to stand for membership of a North East Regional Assembly on her retirement from Westminster, but the proposed body was rejected by a margin of 4–1 in a referendum in November 2004. In Parliament as a backbencher Quin was the first woman to chair the Northern Group of Labour MPs and Chaired the All-Party Group for France (Franco-British Parliamentary Group). She successfully lobbied Chancellor Gordon Brown to bring in the nationwide concessionary bus travel scheme for pensioners

Life peer 
In April 2006, it was announced that Quin had been nominated for a life peerage by the Labour Party. On 30 May, she was created Baroness Quin, of Gateshead in the County of Tyne and Wear. Quin was appointed a shadow Department for Environment, Food and Rural Affairs minister by Harriet Harman in May 2010, and was retained in that role by Ed Miliband after his election as Leader of the Labour Party. She stood down from this position in July 2011. 

In November 2007, Baroness Quin was appointed Chair of the Franco-British Council (British Section). In 2010 she was awarded "Officier de la Légion d'Honneur" by the French Government.

She was interviewed in 2014 as part of The History of Parliament's oral history project.

Quin has volunteered as a Newcastle City Tourist Guide since 1976. She is President of the Northumbrian Pipers' Society (since 2009) and President of the Northumberland National Park Foundation (since 2016). Since September 2017 she has been Chair of the Strategic Board of Tyne and Wear Museums.

In 2010 Quin authored a book titled "The British Constitution, Continuity and Change - An Inside View: Authoritative Insight into How Modern Britain Works" 
 published by Northern Writers  and is co-author of the book “Angels of the North - Notable Women of the North-East” with Moira Kilkenny, published 2018, reprinted 2019 by Tyne Bridge Publishing .

References

|-

|-

|-

|-

|-

1944 births
Living people
Academics of Durham University
Academics of the University of Bath
Alumni of Newcastle University
Alumni of the London School of Economics
Life peeresses created by Elizabeth II
Female members of the Parliament of the United Kingdom for English constituencies
British people of Irish descent
Labour Party (UK) life peers
Labour Party (UK) MEPs
Labour Party (UK) MPs for English constituencies
Members of the Privy Council of the United Kingdom
MEPs for England 1979–1984
MEPs for England 1984–1989
20th-century women MEPs for England
Transport and General Workers' Union-sponsored MPs
UK MPs 1987–1992
UK MPs 1992–1997
UK MPs 1997–2001
UK MPs 2001–2005
20th-century British women politicians
21st-century British women politicians
21st-century English women
21st-century English people